Arhopala agesias  is a species of butterfly belonging to the lycaenid family described by William Chapman Hewitson in 1862. It is found in  Southeast Asia (Peninsular Malaya, Sumatra, Borneo and Pulau Laut).

References

External links
"Arhopala Boisduval, 1832" at Markku Savela's Lepidoptera and Some Other Life Forms. Retrieved June 7, 2017.

Arhopala
Butterflies described in 1862
Butterflies of Asia
Taxa named by William Chapman Hewitson